This list of television stations in Serbia and Montenegro comprises those television stations which existed in the former union of Serbia and Montenegro during 2003 and 2006:

National television stations

RTS 1 - Serbia
RTS 2 - Serbia
RTS 3 - Serbia (no longer on air)
TV Avala - Serbia
Fox Televizija - Serbia (part of Balkan News Corp.)
Happy TV - Serbia
B92 - Serbia
RTV Pink -private, Serbia and Montenegro, Bosnia, Satellite 
TVCG 1 - Montenegro
TVCG 2 parliament - Montenegro
TVCG 3 - Montenegro
TVNS 1 - Serbia
TVNS 2 - Serbia

Private television stations
BKTV - belongs to BK Group, Serbia (lost license in June 2006 and is no longer on the air, revived in 2017 as a new name of Nova.rs and was closed in 2020)
Studio B - city of Belgrade, Serbia
SOS Kanal - Sport, Serbia (now SOS Kanal Plus)
Art - Serbia (closed as of 2016)
Metropolis - music, Serbia (rebranded to Moja TV and closed in 2016)
Politika - Serbia (now closed)
Hallmark - Serbian version, Serbia (became Universal Channel and then Diva)
MTV Adria - Serbian version, Serbia (now closed)
Film + - Serbian version, Serbia (now Fox Movies)
Sport Klub - Serbian version, Serbia (rebranded to SK 1)
Discovery Channel - Serbian version, Serbia
TV 1000 - Serbian version, Serbia

See also
List of Serbian language television channels
Television in Montenegro
Television in Serbia
Serbia and Montenegro